Free Fall is a studio album by Jimmy Giuffre, released in 1963.

Track listing
All tracks written by Jimmy Giuffre

Side A
 Propulsion - 1:44
 Threewe - 4:11
 Ornothoids - 2:42
 Dichotomy - 3:57
 Man Alone - 2:16
 Spasmodic - 3:22
Side B
 Yggdrasill - 2:33
 Divided Man - 1:52
 Primordial Call - 2:17
 The Five Ways - 10:20

1999 CD reissue bonus tracks
 Present Notion - 3:41
 Motion Suspended - 3:15
 Future Plans - 3:55
 Past Mistakes - 2:05
 Time Will Tell - 3:49
 Let's See - 3:25

Personnel
Jimmy Giuffre - clarinet
Paul Bley - piano (tracks: 2, 6, 10, 12)
Steve Swallow - double bass (tracks: 2, 4, 6, 8, 10, 12)

References

1963 albums
Jimmy Giuffre albums
Columbia Records albums